Korna Chamarua is a village near Hathras and Sadabad, in the Indian state of Uttar Pradesh.

This village holds the history of giving politicians to the State Government. The main occupation of the village people is agriculture. 

The literacy in the Village is almost 90%. 

Villages in Hathras district